Tobias Badila (born 12 May 1993) is a footballer who currently plays for French Ligue 2 side AS Nancy as a left back. Born in France, he represents Republic of the Congo at international level.

Career
Badila is a youth exponent from AS Nancy. He made his Ligue 2 debut on 21 February 2014 in a 2–0 away defeat against Troyes AC playing the first 79 minutes of the game before being substituted for Romain Grange. He can perform both centre-back or left-back, because of his great physique. At points in his career he was watched by teams such as AS Saint-Etienne, Monaco and Arsenal, although he preferred to stay to continue his progress.

International career
Badila was pre-selected by Congo on 19 May 2017. He his senior debut for the Republic of the Congo in a 3–1 2019 Africa Cup of Nations qualification loss to the DR Congo on 10 June 2017.

References

Living people
1993 births
Sportspeople from Dijon
Association football defenders
Republic of the Congo footballers
Republic of the Congo international footballers
French footballers
French sportspeople of Republic of the Congo descent
AS Nancy Lorraine players
Ligue 1 players
Ligue 2 players
Black French sportspeople
Footballers from Bourgogne-Franche-Comté
20th-century French people
21st-century French people